Uvariopsis submontana is a species of plant in the Annonaceae family. It is endemic to Cameroon.  Its natural habitat is subtropical or tropical moist lowland forests. It is threatened by habitat loss.

References

Endemic flora of Cameroon
Annonaceae
Endangered plants
Taxonomy articles created by Polbot